Homestead Meadows may refer to:
 Homestead Meadows North, Texas
 Homestead Meadows South, Texas